Loewia is a genus of flowering plants from East Kenya, Ethiopia and Somalia, belonging to the family Passifloraceae.

Species 

 Loewia glutinosa Urb.
 Loewia tanaensis Urb.

References 

Malpighiales genera
Passifloraceae
Taxa described in 1896
Taxa named by Ignatz Urban